The Centro Amazónico de Antropología y Aplicación Práctica (Amazon Center of Anthropology and Practical Application; CAAAP) is a non-profit association.  Formerly named the Centro Amazónico de Antropología y Acción Pastoral (Amazon Center of Anthropology and Pastoral Action), it was constituted in 1974 by eight bishops who belonged to the Peruvian forest Catholic church as an institution for the service of the marginalized populations of Amazonas. Anthropology professors from the Pontifical Catholic University of Peru have been involved in the organization over the years. The organization aims to promote the study of people in the Amazon region. Though it is known more for this research than for evangelism, it is affiliated with the church and one goal of its research is to facilitate evangelism.

References

Further reading

External links
Official website

Catholic Church in Peru